"Could You Be the One?" is a single by British rock band Stereophonics which was released on 15 February 2010. It is the second single taken from their seventh studio album, Keep Calm and Carry On. It failed to chart in the UK, their first single to do so.

Talking about the track, singer Kelly Jones says: "I knew there was something in the melody. I was trying to keep it beautiful rather than piling in for a big chorus.".

Track listing
Digital download
"Could You Be the One?" (3:52)

References

2009 songs
2010 singles
Stereophonics songs
Songs written by Kelly Jones
Mercury Records singles